Taken Out is an Australian television dating game show that was originally broadcast on Network Ten between 1 September 2008 and 26 February 2009. The format was developed by FremantleMedia (now Fremantle) and was hosted by James Kerley.

This title was also used for United Kingdom, Ireland, the Philippines and the United States versions of the show. A new Australian version of Take Me Out, hosted by comedian Joel Creasey, aired on the Seven Network from 3 September until 27 November 2018.

Versions have also been made in Sweden, Indonesia, Japan, China, Spain,  Finland, Thailand, Germany, Italy, France, Malaysia, Taiwan, Canada (Quebec), Vietnam and Lebanon.

Format
Taken Out is primarily a studio-based show, with limited amounts of location-based material, that involves a single person who is introduced to thirty single people of the opposite sex which were revealed to them in the Taken Out arena. The show is split into two sections: The initial selection in the studio, and the two stage date.  During the course of the game, the host presents information and videos about the single person and based upon this information, the thirty people periodically decide independently, if they should 'leave their light on' and stay in the game with the chance to date the single person or to 'turn their light out' and exclude themselves from the chance to date the person.

Initial selection
Note: The following is described with one single man being presented to thirty single women. The opposite (one single woman presented to thirty single men) also occurs.
Firstly, the women learnt a single piece of information about the single man which, along with his appearance, they used to decide whether they were interested or not. The women then judged and turned their lights off or on depending on their decision, however once they had turned their lights off, they couldn't change their minds. Then there would be a video of the single man shown, where they would describe their best features and qualities to try to keep as many women in the game as possible. The women then judged again. Next, a video by the single man's friend, family member, co worker or ex-partner was shown. The women then decided again. Finally, if there were four or more women left with their lights on, the single man walked around the arena and personally met each remaining woman and either turn her light out or left hers on until there were only three women remaining. Then the single man asked a question to the three women, in which he then chose one woman to dismiss. This occurred again for the remaining two women. At the end the single man formally got asked if they would like to date the remaining woman or not. The first question was skipped if only two women are remaining and the single man still got to ask a question if only one woman was remaining before arriving at the question stage. If at any stage of the game all thirty women had turned their lights off, the game ended immediately and the single man left the show without a woman. During the whole process Kerley walked around the arena and chatted with different women asking for their opinions of the single man and why they had kept their light on or turned it off.

Dating process
After the initial selection is complete, a three-stage dating process occurs. Firstly, the couple get to chat in private in a 'green room' at the studios in which they can get to know each other better in an uninfluenced environment. Next up, the couple meet for a date at a Melbourne restaurant, bar, massage parlour or other similar place. If either person is still interested in the other, there is an opportunity to attend a rendezvous at the Eureka Tower observation deck, where champagne and views of Melbourne at night await. This can often embarrassingly lead to only one person attending the rendezvous point. The latter two meetings are optional, however most attend the second stage. After all possible meetings, a final verdict is delivered. If either person wants the relationship to continue, they 'leave their light on' but if they wish for the relationship to end, they 'turn their light out'. This process is shown on the episode after the episode where their pairing was determined in the studio.

Broadcast
The show originally screened Monday to Friday in the 7pm timeslot before it was moved to an earlier 6pm timeslot after two weeks on air, due to competition from other shows. It was removed from schedules in its fourth week after screening 19 episodes, due to continuing mediocre ratings. Despite the axing, FremantleMedia continued to produce new episodes. In total, 65 episodes had been recorded. On 12 January 2009, Taken Out returned to air at around midnight each morning, seven days a week. The remaining 46 episodes aired until 26 February 2009.

The show has also aired on Australian subscription television channel Channel V.

International versions

References

External links
 Official Website
 .

Network 10 original programming
2008 Australian television series debuts
2009 Australian television series endings
Australian game shows
2000s Australian game shows
Australian dating and relationship reality television series
Television series by Fremantle (company)